Ingebjørg Prestegard (born 3 April 1928) is a Norwegian politician for the Centre Party.

For the 1973 Norwegian parliamentary election she was the third candidate on the ballot in Hordaland, behind Sverre Helland and Berge Sæberg. She was elected as a deputy representative for the term 1973–1977, and again became a deputy in 1977–1981. In total she met during 10 days of parliamentary session. In local politics, she was mayor of Granvin.

References

1928 births
Living people
People from Granvin
Deputy members of the Storting
Centre Party (Norway) politicians
Mayors of places in Hordaland
Women mayors of places in Norway
20th-century Norwegian women politicians
20th-century Norwegian politicians
Women members of the Storting